World Standards Day (or International Standards Day) is an international day celebrated internationally each year on 14 October. The day honours the efforts of the thousands of experts who develop voluntary standards within standards development organizations such as the American Society of Mechanical Engineers (ASME), International Electrotechnical Commission (IEC), International Ethics Standards Board for Accountants (IESBA), International Organization for Standardization (ISO), International Telecommunication Union (ITU), Institute of Electrical and Electronics Engineers (IEEE) and Internet Engineering Task Force (IETF). The aim of World Standards Day is to raise awareness among regulators, industry and consumers as to the importance of standardization to the global economy.

14 October was specifically chosen to mark the date, in 1946, when delegates from 25 countries first gathered in London and decided to create an international organization focused on facilitating standardization. Even though ISO was formed one year later, it wasn't until 1970 that the first World Standards Day was celebrated.

Around the globe, various activities are chosen by national standards bodies and intergovernmental organizations to commemorate the date.

The Standards Council of Canada (SCC), Canada's national accreditation body, celebrates World Standards Day together with the international community by observing the day near the dates of the international observance. In 2012 SCC celebrated World Standards Day on Friday, 12 October.
The World Trade Organization, for the celebration of World Standards Day, 14 October 2020, discussed the TBT Committee's Six Principles for the development of international standards
The United States holds an annual U.S. Celebration of World Standards Day

Notes

References 
 International Organization for Standardization "World Standards Days - 14 October from 1998 till 2013."
 Standards Council of Canada "2012: SCC will be celebrating Friday October 12th"

External links 
 World Standards Day Site
 Standards Council of Canada (SCC)

International observances
October observances
Standards